Ikarus 280 was an articulated bus produced by Hungarian bus manufacturer Ikarus from 1973 to 2002. It was succeeded by the Ikarus 435 in 1985.

Construction features 
The Ikarus 280 is a model of the Ikarus 200 series. It is made of two rigid sections linked by a pivoting joint. The body is a semi-self-supporting body with a frame, the Raba-MAN D2156 inline-6 diesel engine is mounted in the front section. It powers the middle axle, meaning that the bus has puller configuration. All three axles are air-sprung beam axles with additional telescopic shock absorbers. Both rear and middle axles were made by Rába, while the front axle was made by LiAZ. The manual gearboxes came in either five- or six-speed configuration, and were mated with a dry single-disc clutch. The Ikarus 280 has a pneumatic braking system, a spring loaded parking brake, and an exhaust brake. The steering is hydraulically assisted. The buses, in actual applications, have a minimum of 26 seats, and space for up to 134 additional standing passengers.

Production and operation 
Production started in 1973 and ended in 2002. The 280 was based on the Ikarus 200 platform and had many variants produced. Currently (2020), the number of Ikarus 280 buses in active service is declining, due to supply of new low-floor buses. The articulated buses 281(RHD), 282 and 283 (-versions), 284 (pusher configuration), C80, C83, the articulated trolleybuses Ikarus 280T, 283T, 284T and the double articulated Ikarus 293 were based on the Ikarus 280.

Ikarus C80 
Ikarus C80 is a limited-run reproduction of Ikarus 280 in 2000s. It is slightly different from original Ikarus 280 in few regards. All are used by Hungarian company Volanbusz.

See also 
 List of buses

Notes

References 

Articulated buses
Ikarus buses
Step-entrance buses
Vehicles introduced in 1973